The Audi V8 (Typ 4C) is a four-door, full-size luxury sedan, designed, manufactured and marketed by Audi in Germany from 1988-1993, as the company's flagship. As the first car from Audi to use a V8 engine,  also was the first Audi to combine a quattro system with an automatic transmission. Early cars used 3.6-litre V8s, while later cars featured a 4.2-litre version of the engine. The Audi V8 was replaced by the Audi A8 in 1994, although the A8 was not marketed in North America until 1996.

The competition model of the Audi V8 won back-to-back Deutsche Tourenwagen Meisterschaft driver's titles in 1990 and 1991, with the championship winners being Hans-Joachim Stuck and Frank Biela respectively. Audi was the first company to win back-to-back DTM titles.

Overview
Standard features for the Audi V8 included a 32-valve, double overhead camshaft (DOHC) V8 engine and a four-speed electronically controlled ZF 4HP24A automatic transmission providing Audi's quattro permanent four-wheel drive system. A five-speed (later in production six-speed) manual transmission was also available.

The Audi V8 had a galvanized steel body, with a 10-year anti-perforation warranty (against corrosion). The Audi V8 was specifically designed to be a top of the range 'flagship' car and included a number of luxury features as standard equipment, including leather seating and Audi's quattro all wheel drive system (see standard features list). The Audi V8 created a new elevated image for the company, providing a viable alternative to established competitors such as Mercedes-Benz and BMW. In this regard, the car was a cornerstone in developing the history of the Audi marque as it is today.

Factory production commenced in October 1988, and ceased in November 1993, although sales of completed vehicles continued in 1994. It was replaced by the Audi A8 in 1994.

Body style
The styling of the Audi V8 resembled the Typ 44 Audi 100 and 200 models, and was based on a stretched version of the Volkswagen Group C3 automobile platform, known either as the D1 or D11 platform. The Audi V8 differed from the Audi 100/200 with a unique grille attached to the hood, new bumpers and headlights, all-red tail lamps, 12 mm extended wheelbase, wider track, pronounced fenders, and more wood trim in the interior.  Furthermore, only alloy wheels were offered, ranging from 15 to 17 inches.

In addition to the standard-length model, there was also a long wheelbase (LWB), ('Lang' in German) version of the V8 (refer to the infobox for differences in dimensions). It was assembled at Steyr-Daimler-Puch factory in Graz (see production figures).  This tradition would continue with the A8, offered in "A8L" format (though only in year 2010 A8L reached the size of the V8L).

A once-off experimental Avant (estate) version was built for the wife of former Audi CEO Ferdinand Piech.  This car is no longer on display at the Audi Forum Ingolstadt, but in storage in Neckarsulm.

Powertrain
Powertrain detail of the Audi V8 featured one of two all-new, all-aluminium alloy engines – both petrol engines, and both in V8 configuration with 32 valves (four valves per cylinder) with dual valve springs, and four overhead camshafts (DOHC). The design set the pattern for future Audi-developed Volkswagen Group V8 engines. In addition to using an all-aluminum alloy cylinder block (when the established material was grey cast iron), the camshafts were driven using a hybrid method. A rubber/kevlar toothed timing belt, driven from the front of the crankshaft operated only the exhaust camshaft in each bank. The inlet camshafts were then operated via a simplex roller chain from the exhaust camshaft – the right bank, (cylinders 1–4) at the rear of the engine, and the left bank (cylinders 5–8) at the front of the engine, immediately behind the timing belt. This method reduced the complexity of the timing belt layout, and as a result, required fewer components, such as idler rollers and guides, and led to easier and less costly maintenance of the timing belt and associated components. A thermostatically controlled electric cooling fan also became standard, replacing the engine-driven viscous fans on earlier cars. This not only provided forced airflow for the engine coolant radiator, but also for the smaller engine oil cooler.

Audi's 'trademark' quattro permanent (or semi-permanent, dependent on gearbox type) four-wheel drive system was the only offering for the drivetrain. This normally distributes the engine torque as a 'default' 50:50 between front and rear axles, but can automatically dynamically apportion up to a bias of 20:80 to 80:20 front and rear. The automatic transmission utilizes a hydraulically controlled multi-plate clutch to apportion drive between front and rear axles, whereas the manual transmission variants utilize a Torsen type 1 Torque Sensing center differential. The rear axle final drive unit contains a Torsen type 1 Torque Sensing differential, instead of the more common hypoid open differential.

Engines

Both available engines used a Bosch Motronic fully electronic engine control unit (ECU), with cylinder bank selective knock control, dual-barrel throttle valve, lambda mixture control via intake air volume metering and exhaust gas temperature sensor, and required unleaded petrol. Fuel was delivered to the combustion chambers via eight intake manifold-sited electronic fuel injectors, fed from two common fuel rails (one per cylinder bank), and were sequentially 'fired' or activated in accordance with the engine's firing order.  Whilst the 3.6 V8 was able to use 95 RON (91 AKI) fuel, for the 4.2 V8, the more expensive 98 RON (93 AKI) 'SuperPlus' unleaded was required in order to achieve the quoted power output. The usage of 95 RON in the 4.2 V8 resulted in a lower power output, as well as increased fuel consumption.

At the initial launch of the Audi V8, the only offering was the 3.6-litre powerplant, which displaced . In August 1991, Audi introduced a 4.2-litre engine, displacing , to complement the choice of the existing 3.6-litre V8. This shared many components from the 3.6 V8, and the 4.2 unit was identical to the optional V8 used in the Audi S4 (aka Ur-S4), sharing the same rated outputs and ABH identification code. Like the 3.6 V8 model, the existing four-speed automatic gearbox remained available. However, a new six-speed manual gearbox replaced the five-speed manual. This powerplant is identified by chrome 'V8' badges on the front grille and at trunk lid, where in some cars also '4.2 quattro' badge is present.

Details and performance

Transmissions
A choice of transmissions were offered. A ZF Friedrichshafen-sourced four-speed 4HP24A automatic transmission with a torque converter was available throughout the V8 production run. Automatic transmission has three modes: "S" – Sport; "E" – Economic and "M" – Manual operation. Sport mode is changing gears at higher rpm than Economic; Manual mode allows driver to choose gears using the lever. There were also two manual transmission offerings – for the 3.6: a five-speed manual gearbox, or later for the 4.2, a six-speed manual. Both manual transmission variants used a  single-plate clutch.

Details
The details of Audi V8 transmission are shown in the table below:

Steering, brakes, wheels
The Audi V8 came equipped with rack and pinion power assisted steering (PAS) as standard. An electronically controlled variable assisted 'servotronic' version was also available. It was fitted with a high-performance brake system, which included radially ventilated disc brakes front and rear. The fronts also incorporated electronic brake pad wear sensors. A Bosch anti-lock braking system (ABS) was also standard.

Standard wheels were  'aero' style light alloy wheels shod with 215/60 R15 steel-belted radial tyres.  Optional multi-spoke BBS-sourced (with Audi centre-cap badge) alloy wheels were also available, in either , or  sizes.

Features

The Audi V8 came standard with a range of features, including a BOSE audio system with eight speakers, walnut wood trim, leather interior, and heated seats. The only paint finishes available were pearlescent or metallic. Some available colors included pearl white, lago blue (teal), blue mica, tornado red, black, amongst others. The lists below details other standard and optional features.

Standard
Standard features that came with the Audi V8.

 Anti-theft vehicle alarm system
 Drivers frontal airbag (from 1991, front passenger airbag)
 Three-point seatbelts front & rear
 Procon-ten safety system
 Child safety door locks
 First aid kit (built in armrest in the rear seats)
 Two-side galvanized bodywork
 Automatic climate control system
 Electronic cruise control
 Dual power side mirrors with electrically heated defog
 Power windows with rear window disable
 Power central locking system
 Trip information computer (6 function)
 Auto check system with radio function display
 Expandable storage/ski sack
 Tinted glass
 Rear window defogger
 Interior lighting courtesy delay
 Illuminated vanity mirrors, trunk engine compartment, glovebox, lighters and ashtray
 Audi/Bose eight-speaker music system
 GSM cellular telephone with hands-free feature (built in armrest between front seats)
 Walnut wood trim, woven wool carpets
 Power front seats with 4-position driver memory
 Electrically heatable front & rear seats
 Aerodynamic halogen headlamps with wiper/washer system
 Front wipers with intermittent mode and heated windshield washer nozzles
 Front & rear fog lights

Optional
Optional features that were offered with the Audi V8.

 Electrically heated door lock cylinders
 Sports front seats with extendable thigh support
 Power operated rear window roller sunblind, with manual operated rear side window roller sunblinds
 Webasto fuel-burning cabin heater

Motorsport

In the 1990 DTM season all of the three teams claimed together the entire podium (1st, 2nd and 3rd places) at Hockenheimring race. Stuck won the title, and the following year, Audi added a second team to the mix, Audi Zentrum Reutlingen (AZR). SMS continued with Stuck and Jelinski, while AZR raced with Frank Biela and Hubert Haupt. Biela gave Audi another crown in 1991, but was unable to defend the title in 1992.

For the 1992 season, Audi had changed their engines to use a 180° flatplane crankshaft, which they said had been re-forged and bent from the original 90° crossplane part as used in production model. The DTM organisers found this highly modified crankshaft deviated from original homologated standard crankshaft, and therefore deemed it illegal. Audi subsequently withdrew from the championship.

During its presence at DTM the Audi V8 competed with much smaller and about  lighter Mercedes 190, BMW M3, and slightly smaller Opel Omega 3000. None of those cars were equipped with V8 engines or 4-wheel drive.

References

External links

 Audi.com – official corporate website
 AudiV8.com  fanclub site with technical info
 North American Consumer Guide review with image gallery
 Christoph Bauer: DRIVE IT! – Revolutionary for almost 30 years: Audi V8, DW-TV 21 August 2017 (YouTube)
 

V8
All-wheel-drive vehicles
Full-size vehicles
Flagship vehicles
Luxury vehicles
Sedans
Cars introduced in 1988
1990s cars
Cars discontinued in 1993